The Girls of Pleasure Island is a 1953 Technicolor comedy film directed by Alvin Ganzer and F. Hugh Herbert. The screenplay by F. Hugh Herbert is based on the novel Pleasure Island by former Marine William Maier. The original music score is composed by Lyn Murray.

Plot

In 1945, Roger Halyard is a stiff-upper-lipped British gentleman who lives on a South Pacific island with his three nubile, naive daughters, Violet, Hester and Gloria. Hoping to shelter the girls from the lascivious advances of the opposite sex, Halyard is thwarted when 1,500 Marines arrive to transform the island into an aircraft landing base. Despite the best efforts of Halyard, his housekeeper Thelma, and Marine Colonel Reade, romance blossoms between the three girls and a trio of handsome leathernecks.

Movie rights and storyline revisions
William Maier was a USMC officer who served in the South Pacific during World War II, rising to the rank of Major by 1945. His book was a mixed genre effort, often pastoral in tone, and largely dealt with the protagonist's efforts to prevent disruption to the indigenous way of life on the half of the island he owned. Louella Parsons revealed in her syndicated newspaper column that the movie rights to the book had been purchased by Harry Cohn for Columbia Studios three months before its publication.
 
Cohn's intent was to film the picture on Jamaica, using the working title of Virgin Island. The producer was to be S. Sylvan Simon, with Roland Kibbee writing the screenplay. However, nothing came of the venture, and the movie rights were later picked up by Paramount, with F. Hugh Herbert assigned to write and direct the film.

Herbert's screenplay removed the fictional island from Melanesia to Polynesia, made the central character Roger Halyard the British Administrator of the island instead of a private landowner, and dispensed entirely with the indigenous population and most of the European colonists. The three daughters, who had independent lifestyles and seldom interacted in the book, were rendered as less mature and closer knit in the screenplay, which also invented the character of Thelma the housekeeper. The book's chief villain, Colonel Reade, was whitewashed from a boozy lecher to a sympathetic commander, while the youngest daughter was renamed from Elsie to Gloria and made two years younger in the movie.

Production
Based on a 1949 novel Pleasure Island that was the working title,
Paramount acquired the property in 1951 from Columbia Pictures who did not produce it.

At times, Robert Donat and William Holden were considered for the film.

For the three English daughters, Paramount interviewed 900 aspiring actresses, with nine
given screen tests
at Pinewood Studios. Joan Elan, Audrey Dalton and Dorothy Bromiley, each of them then attending a different drama school, were chosen.

The three were contracted by Paramount and were given massive publicity including a cover story in LIFE magazine and made tours to promote the film, including "GI Premieres" to troops fighting the Korean War.

The film was made on Paramount's backlot in 1952.  During the filming director F. Hugh Herbert became ill and was replaced by assistant director Alvin Ganzer.

Included in the cast playing marines were Earl Holliman, Ross Bagdasarian, Sr., Benny Bartlett. Buck Young and Johnny Downs.

Main cast
 Don Taylor - Lieutenant Gilmartin
 Leo Genn - Roger Halyard
 Elsa Lanchester - Thelma
 Philip Ober - Colonel Reade
 Joan Elan - Violet Halyard
 Audrey Dalton - Hester Halyard
 Dorothy Bromiley - Gloria Halyard
 Peter Baldwin - Private Henry Smith
 Gene Barry - Captain Beaton
 Arthur Gould-Porter - Reverend Bates
 Barry Bernard - Wilkinson

Notes

External links
 
 Gene Barry photos from the film http://www.xmission.com/~emailbox/gb-girlsofpleasureisland.htm

1953 films
1953 comedy films
American comedy films
Films based on American novels
Pacific War films
Paramount Pictures films
Films scored by Lyn Murray
Films set in 1945
Films set on islands
Films about the United States Marine Corps
Films with screenplays by F. Hugh Herbert
1950s English-language films
Films directed by Alvin Ganzer
1950s American films